This article lists important figures and events in the public affairs of British Malaya during the year 1909.

Incumbent political figures

Central level 
 High Commissioner to the Federated Malay States:
 Sir John Anderson
 Governor of Straits Settlements:
 Sir John Anderson

State level

Straits Settlements
  Penang :
 Residents-Councillor: William Peel
  Malacca :
 Residents-Councillor:

Federated Malay States
  Selangor :
 British Residents of Selangor: Henry Conway Belfield
 Sultan of Selangor: Sultan Sir Alaeddin Sulaiman Shah
  Negri Sembilan:
 British Residents of Negri Sembilan:Douglas Graham Campbell 
 Yang di-Pertuan Besar of Negri Sembilan: Tuanku Muhammad Shah 
   Pahang :
 British Residents of Pahang: 
 Harvey Chevallier (acting, until unknown date)
 Edward Lewis Brockman (from unknown date)
 Sultan of Pahang: Sultan Ahmad Muazzam Shah
  Perak :
 British Residents of Perak: Ernest Woodford Birch 
 Sultan of Perak: Sultan Idris Murshidul Adzam Shah I

Other states

  Perlis :
 Raja of Perlis: Syed Alwi Jamalullail
  Johore :
 Sultan of Johore: Sultan Ibrahim Al-Masyhur
  Kedah :
 Sultan of Kedah: Sultan Abdul Hamid Halim Shah
  Kelantan :
 Sultan of Kelantan: Sultan Muhammad IV 
  Trengganu :
 Sultan of Trengganu: Sultan Zainal Abidin III

Events 
 10 March - The Anglo-Siamese Treaty is signed. Siam transfers suzerainty of the northern Malay states of Perlis, Kedah, Kelantan and Terengganu to the United Kingdom. Siam also cedes parts of Upper Perak (Gerik) region to the Federated Malay States.
 Unknown date – The Birch Memorial Clock Tower is unveiled to commemorate the first British Resident of Perak, James W. W. Birch.

See also
 1908 in Malaya 
 1910 in Malaya
 History of Malaysia

References

1900s in British Malaya
Malaya